Adelin Benoît (12 May 1900 – 18 June 1954) was a Belgian road racing cyclist, born in Châtelet. Surprising newcomer in Tour de France 1925, he got the yellow jersey during 5 days, and won the stage in Luchon ("l'étape des quatre cols").

Major results

1923
 national amateur Road Race championship
1925
Tour de France:
winner 8th stage Bayonne - Luchon
holding the yellow jersey for 5 consecutive days
1926
Bordeaux–Paris
Tour de France:
winner 5th stage Le Havre - Cherbourg
1927
Tour de France:
 winner 9th stage Les Sables d'Olonne - Bordeaux
 winner 19th stage Evian - Pontarlier

References

External links

Official Tour de France results for Adelin Benoit

1900 births
1954 deaths
Belgian male cyclists
Belgian Tour de France stage winners
People from Châtelet
Cyclists from Hainaut (province)